1,1,3-Trichloropropene is a compound of carbon, hydrogen, and chlorine. The structure is like propene, but in this compound, three hydrogen atoms are changed into chlorine atoms.

Chloroalkenes